N. maxima may refer to:

 Nageia maxima, a conifer endemic to Malaysia
 Nepenthes maxima, a pitcher plant
 Nihonia maxima, a sea snail